The Buick Master Six Series 40 and Series 50, based on the wheelbase used, was an automobile built by Buick from 1925 to 1928 and shared the GM B platform with the Oldsmobile Model 30. Previously, the company manufactured the Buick Six that used the overhead valve six-cylinder  engine in their high-end cars, and the Buick Four for smaller, less-expensive cars. Starting with 1918, they dropped the four-cylinder engine and designed a small six, which they called the Buick Standard Six, to replace that end of the market. They coined the name "Master Six" for the high-end cars, now powered by the   engine released the year before. The yearly changes were a result of a new business philosophy called planned obsolescence

History

As GM was sharing platforms and technology within their divisions, the Master Six was related to the Oldsmobile Model 30 with shared wheelbase and engine sizes. Buick had developed a market reputation as being a conservative luxury car, while the Cadillac and the Packard Six were more flamboyant, extravagant and expensive. The last Emperor of China Puyi bought 2 1924 Master Six and started the trend of being China's most popular car. 

To promote its durability Buick President Harry H. Basset had a Touring Sedan driven around the world via a dealer-to-dealer network, where each location was responsible for driving the car to the next destination and having the log book signed for authenticity. 1927 saw the introduction of the Gothic Goddess hood ornament on all Buick products. The top of the radiator grille adopted a scalloped look that blended into the top of the engine cover which differed from both Oldsmobile and Cadillac sedans of the same year and was only offered from 1925 until 1928. It shared a similar appearance on all Packard products that first appeared in 1904 on the Packard Four, and the recently introduced Chrysler Imperial.

Buick named their six-cylinder cars "Buick Six" from 1916 through 1924, and in 1925, divided them into Standard Six and Master Six. The Master 6 used Series 121 and 129 designations in 1929 initially to denote the wheelbase dimensions, then renamed the Series 40 in 1930. All were powered by the overhead valve Buick Straight-6 engine, with multiple body styles, and starting in 1926 used the newly established GM B platform, which it shared with Oldsmobile L-Series. Coachwork continued to be offered by Fisher Body who was the primary supplier of all GM products at this time, and Duco automotive lacquer paint, introduced by DuPont was the first quick drying multi-color line of nitrocellulose lacquers made especially for the automotive industry.

Although Buick produced mostly four-cylinder cars in the teens and early '20s, as it had been doing, the new six-cylinder cars became more common industry wide. Buick first made six-cylinder cars in 1914, with a  engine, which was originally a racing engine, later used in limited production as the Series 50. Roadsters and touring sedans had the ability to fold the windshield forward on top of the cowl for open air driving.

Buick's special order catalog was more modest than the Cadillac Series 341, but it did benefit from the specialized bodies made by Fisher Body which gave the Buick customer the same attention to style and refinement but at a modest price. The top level choice for the longest Buick wheelbase of 129" was the Imperial Sedan Limousine for US$2145 ($ in  dollars ).

The Master Six was Buick's high-end offering, above the Standard Six. It was also manufactured from knock-down kits at GM's short-lived Japanese factory at Osaka Assembly in Osaka, Japan. The Master Six was also sold with a junior model, called the Standard Six which were renamed in 1929 as the Series 116, and Series 121.

See also
Cadillac Type V-63
Oldsmobile L-Series
Oakland Six
Pontiac Six
Chevrolet Superior

References

 Slauson, H. W.; Howard Greene (1926). "Leading American Motor Cars". Everyman's Guide to Motor Efficiency. New York: Leslie-Judge Company.

Master Six